Mujdin Aliu (15 January 1974 – 14 April 1999) was an Albanian soldier who gained prominence in the Kosovo War. He served in the Kosovo Liberation Army (KLA), where he fought in the Battle of Koshare.

Mujdin and the KLA seized the peak of Koshares and immediately began entrenching themselves. The KLA took Maja Glava with massive artillery support and continued to bombard the Yugoslav Koshare Outpost, which resulted in the Yugoslav soldiers having to abandon their posts. On April 14, Yugoslav troops launched a surprise assault on Maja Glava. Mujdin Aliu died defending the post, resulting in the Yugoslav Army being able to take Maja Glava.

Legacy
Aliu is regarded in high esteem by the KLA and the National Liberation Army (NLA). Considered a heroic martyr who died for the freedom of the Kosovar Albanians, the 112th Brigade of the NLA, which fought in Mujdin's home town of Tetovo, was named the Mujdin Aliu Brigade.

References

Kosovo Liberation Army soldiers
1974 births
1999 deaths
People from Tetovo Municipality
Albanians in North Macedonia
20th-century Albanian military personnel
Military personnel killed in the Kosovo War